Zamia elegantissima is a species of cycad in the family Zamiaceae. It is found on the Atlantic Coast of Colón Province, Panama.

References

Whitelock, Loran M. 2002. The Cycads. Portland: Timber Press.

External links
 

elegantissima
Flora of Panama